Fradley and Streethay is a civil parish in the district of Lichfield, Staffordshire, England.  The parish contains 26 listed buildings that are recorded in the National Heritage List for England.  All the listed buildings are designated at Grade II, the lowest of the three grades, which is applied to "buildings of national importance and special interest".  The parish includes the villages of Fradley and Streethay and the surrounding area.  The Trent and Mersey Canal and Coventry Canal meet in the parish at Fradley Junction, and the listed buildings on the canals are bridges, locks, workshops, and milestones.  Most of the other listed buildings are houses, cottages and farmhouse, the earlier of which are timber framed.  The other listed buildings include a well head, a hotel, and a public house.


Buildings

References

Citations

Sources

Lichfield District
Lists of listed buildings in Staffordshire